Gerasimovo is a rural locality (a village) in Sidorovskoye Rural Settlement, Gryazovetsky District, Vologda Oblast, Russia. It had a population of 4 as of 2002.

Geography 
Gerasimovo is located 38 km southeast of Gryazovets (the district's administrative centre) by road. Anokhino is the nearest rural locality.

References 

Rural localities in Gryazovetsky District